The Lexicon Universale of 1698 is an early modern humanist encyclopedia in Latin by Johann Jacob Hofmann of Basel (1635-1706). It appeared in four volumes with 1,000 pages each.
 
Lexicon Universale, Historiam Sacram Et Profanam Omnis aevi, omniumque Gentium; Chronologiam Ad Haec Usque Tempora; Geographiam Et Veteris Et Novi Orbis; Principum Per Omnes Terras Familiarum [...] Genealogiam; Tum Mythologiam, Ritus, Caerimonias, Omnemque Veterum Antiquitatem [...]; Virorum [...] Celebrium Enarrationem [...]; Praeterea Animalium, Plantarum, Metallorum, Lapidum, Gemmarum, Nomina, Naturas, Vires Explanans. - Editio Absolutissima [...] Auctior [...]. - Leiden: Jacob. Hackius, Cornel. Boutesteyn, Petr. Vander Aa, & Jord. Luchtmans, 1698.

External links
Universität Mannheim. Electronic edition
 
 v.1, A-C
 v.2, D-L
 v.3, M-Q
 v.4, R-Z, Nomenclator, Index Rerum

Latin encyclopedias
1698 books
17th-century Latin books